Alexandru "Alex" Gabriel Gordaș (born 11 May 1994) is a Romanian rugby union football player. He played in the prop  position for SuperLiga club CSM București. He also plays for Romania's national team, the Oaks, making his international debut at the 2015 World Rugby Nations Cup in a match against the Argentina Jaguares.

Career
Before joining Steaua București, Alex Gordaș played for Olimpia București and Worcester Warriors.

References

External links

1994 births
Living people
Romanian rugby union players
Romania international rugby union players
CSM București (rugby union) players
Worcester Warriors players	
CSA Steaua București (rugby union) players
Rugby union props